The Ireland women's cricket team toured England in June 2012. They played England in 1 Twenty20 International, which was won by England, and played India in 1 One Day International, which was won by India. The series preceded India's tour of England.

Squads

Tour Match: England Academy v Ireland

Only T20I

Only ODI: Ireland v India

See also
 Indian women's cricket team in England in 2012

References

External links
Ireland Women tour of England 2012 from Cricinfo

Ireland women's cricket team tours
Women's cricket tours of England
International cricket competitions in 2012
2012 in women's cricket